Mrs. Jones Entertains is a 1909 American silent short comedy film directed by D. W. Griffith. The Internet Movie Database lists Mary Pickford as appearing in this short. However, Pickford did not begin with Biograph until the end of April 1909.

Plot
Dear little Mrs. Jones once gave a tea party to her temperance friends, at which Mr. Jones unfortunately got intoxicated. So his presence was objected to when the ladies met again. As luck would have it the waiter who was to serve the repast could not come, and so Jones, poor fellow, consented to disguise himself and act as waiter to his own wife's guests. These prim and virtuous ladies duly arrived; the meal was served and all proceeded happily until Jones, who received the dishes from a pert maid in the kitchen, was seized by a desire to try an experiment before the meal was finished. Discovering a bottle which appeared to contain a spirituous liquid, he poured some into each of the guests' cups. The effect of the experiment was soon apparent. The ladies got more communicative towards each; they warmed and melted: they clamored for more "tea"; they got quite boisterous and just slightly indecorous, and finally so abusive and intoxicated that Mrs. Jones had to clear them off, and then husband and wife were reconciled, presumably with a promise on his part to behave himself in future.

Cast
 John R. Cumpson as Mr. Jones
 Florence Lawrence as Mrs. Jones
 Jeanie MacPherson as The Maid
 Linda Arvidson
 Flora Finch as A Guest
 Anthony O'Sullivan
 Mary Pickford as Dorothy Nicholson
 Mack Sennett
 Harry Solter as Delivery Man

References

External links
 
 scene in the film with l to r: Jeanie McPherson, Florence Lawrence, John Cumpson, Anthony O'Sullivan

1909 films
1909 comedy films
1909 short films
Silent American comedy films
American silent short films
American black-and-white films
Films directed by D. W. Griffith
American comedy short films
Films with screenplays by Frank E. Woods
1900s American films